Tacoma School, also known as Tacoma School Community Center, is a historic school building located at Coeburn, Wise County, Virginia. It was built in 1922, and rebuilt after a fire in 1937.  It is a one-story, nine bay rectangular brick building with four classrooms. It has a projecting centered gable bay and a hipped roof.  The school was based on plans adopted by the North Carolina state school system in 1911. It ceased use as a school in 1973, and has been adapted for use as a Community Center. 

It was listed on the National Register of Historic Places in 1997.

References

School buildings on the National Register of Historic Places in Virginia
School buildings completed in 1922
Schools in Wise County, Virginia
National Register of Historic Places in Wise County, Virginia
School buildings completed in 1937
1922 establishments in Virginia